Kot Haibat is a town and union council of Dera Ghazi Khan District in the Punjab province of Pakistan. It is located at 30°6'0N 70°37'0E and has an altitude of 124 metres (410feet).

References

Populated places in Dera Ghazi Khan District
Union councils of Dera Ghazi Khan District
Cities and towns in Punjab, Pakistan